The following outline is provided as an overview of and topical guide to Solomon Islands:

Solomon Islands is a sovereign Melanesian island country located in the South Pacific Ocean, south-east of Papua New Guinea. The capital is Honiara, located on the island of Guadalcanal.

The Solomon Islands archipelago is believed to have been inhabited by Melanesian people for thousands of years. Some of the most bitter fighting of World War II occurred in the Solomon Islands campaign of 1942–45, including the Battle of Guadalcanal. Self-government was achieved in 1976 and independence two years later. The country is a Commonwealth realm.

The historical North Solomon Islands covered Bougainville Island, Choiseul, Santa Isabel, the Shortlands and Ontong Java and were largely under German control until 1900.  The southern Solomon Islands, which included  Guadalcanal, the Nggelas, Gizo, Kolombangara, Marovo Island, Mborokua, New Georgia, Vella Lavella, Vangunu, Rennell, Bellona, Makira, Malaita, Temotu and a number of associated smaller islands were under British control and in 1893 became the British Solomon Islands Protectorate. In 1945, Bougainville, and some associated minor islands, were transferred away from the protectorate to Australian administration and then in 1970 became a part of Papua New Guinea.  The remainder stayed under the protectorate until independence in 1978 at which point they were officially named Solomon Islands.  All of the north and south Solomon Islands taken together are generally referred to as the Solomon Islands to distinguish them from the nation state of Solomon Islands.

Since 1998, ethnic violence, government misconduct, and crime have undermined stability and civil society. In June 2003 an Australian-led "multinational" force, the Regional Assistance Mission to Solomon Islands (RAMSI), arrived to restore peace and disarm ethnic militias.

General reference 

 Pronunciation:
 Common English country name: Solomon Islands
 Official English country name: Solomon Islands
 Common endonym(s):  
 Official endonym(s):  
 Adjectival(s): Solomon Island
 Demonym(s): Solomon Islander
 Etymology: Name of Solomon Islands
 ISO country codes:  SB, SLB, 090
 ISO region codes:  See ISO 3166-2:SB
 Internet country code top-level domain:  .sb

Geography of Solomon Islands 

 Geography of the Solomon Islands

The term the Solomon Islands refers to the group of islands that includes the islands of the nation state Solomon Islands but also other islands such as Bougainville, a province of Papua New Guinea.  The Solomon Islands was the name given to this wider group of geographical islands by the British administration up to the independence of Solomon Islands in 1978; this article concerns itself with the political entity, the nation state of Solomon Islands.

 Solomon Islands is...
 a country
 an island country
 a nation state
 a Commonwealth realm
 consists of an archipelago
 Location:
 Southern Hemisphere and Eastern Hemisphere
 Pacific Ocean
 South Pacific Ocean
 Oceania
 Melanesia
 Time zone:  UTC+11
 Extreme points of Solomon Islands
 High:  Mount Popomanaseu on Guadalcanal 
 Low:  South Pacific Ocean 0 m
 Land boundaries:  none
 Coastline:  South Pacific Ocean 5,313 km
 Population of Solomon Islands: 
 Area of Solomon Islands: 
 Atlas of Solomon Islands

Environment of Solomon Islands 

 Climate of Solomon Islands
 Renewable energy in Solomon Islands
 Geology of Solomon Islands
 Protected areas of Solomon Islands
 Biosphere reserves in Solomon Islands
 National parks of Solomon Islands
 Wildlife of the Solomon Islands archipelago
 Birds of the Solomon Islands archipelago
 Mammals of the Solomon Islands archipelago

Natural geographic features of Solomon Islands 
 Islands of Solomon Islands
 Lakes of Solomon Islands
 Mountains of Solomon Islands
 Volcanoes in Solomon Islands
 Rivers of Solomon Islands
 Waterfalls of Solomon Islands
 Valleys of Solomon Islands
 World Heritage Sites in Solomon Islands

Regions of Solomon Islands 
 Regions of Solomon Islands

Ecoregions of Solomon Islands 
 List of ecoregions in Solomon Islands
 Ecoregions in Solomon Islands

Administrative divisions of Solomon Islands 
 Administrative divisions of Solomon Islands

Provinces of Solomon Islands 
Provinces of Solomon Islands
Central
Choiseul
Guadalcanal
Isabel
Makira-Ulawa
Malaita
Rennell and Bellona
Temotu
Western

Demography of Solomon Islands 
 Demographics of Solomon Islands

Government and politics of Solomon Islands 
 Politics of Solomon Islands
 Form of government: parliamentary monarchy (Commonwealth realm)
 Capital of Solomon Islands: Honiara
 Elections in Solomon Islands
 Political parties in Solomon Islands

Branches of the government of Solomon Islands 
 Government of Solomon Islands
 National Parliament of Solomon Islands

Executive branch of the government of Solomon Islands 
 Head of state: Charles III, King of Solomon Islands
 Head of government: Manasseh Sogavare, Prime Minister of Solomon Islands
 Deputy Prime Minister of Solomon Islands
 Cabinet of Solomon Islands

Legislative branch of the government of Solomon Islands 
 National Parliament of Solomon Islands (unicameral)

Judicial branch of the government of Solomon Islands 
 Court system of Solomon Islands
 Court of Appeal (supreme court)

Foreign relations of Solomon Islands 
 Foreign relations of Solomon Islands
 Diplomatic missions in Solomon Islands
 Diplomatic missions of Solomon Islands

International organisation membership 
The Government of Solomon Islands is a member of:

African, Caribbean, and Pacific Group of States (ACP)
Asian Development Bank (ADB)
Commonwealth of Nations
Economic and Social Commission for Asia and the Pacific (ESCAP)
Food and Agriculture Organization (FAO)
Group of 77 (G77)
International Bank for Reconstruction and Development (IBRD)
International Civil Aviation Organization (ICAO)
International Criminal Court (ICCt) (signatory)
International Development Association (IDA)
International Federation of Red Cross and Red Crescent Societies (IFRCS)
International Finance Corporation (IFC)
International Fund for Agricultural Development (IFAD)
International Labour Organization (ILO)
International Maritime Organization (IMO)
International Monetary Fund (IMF)

International Olympic Committee (IOC)
International Red Cross and Red Crescent Movement (ICRM)
International Telecommunication Union (ITU)
Multilateral Investment Guarantee Agency (MIGA)
Organisation for the Prohibition of Chemical Weapons (OPCW)
Pacific Islands Forum (PIF)
Secretariat of the Pacific Community (SPC)
South Pacific Regional Trade and Economic Cooperation Agreement (Sparteca)
United Nations (UN)
United Nations Conference on Trade and Development (UNCTAD)
United Nations Educational, Scientific, and Cultural Organization (UNESCO)
Universal Postal Union (UPU)
World Health Organization (WHO)
World Meteorological Organization (WMO)
World Trade Organization (WTO)

Law and order in Solomon Islands 
 Law of Solomon Islands
 Constitution of Solomon Islands
 Crime in Solomon Islands
 Human rights in Solomon Islands
 LGBT rights in Solomon Islands
 Freedom of religion in Solomon Islands
 Law enforcement in Solomon Islands

Military of Solomon Islands 
 Military of Solomon Islands
There is no military in Solomon Islands.

Local government in Solomon Islands 
 Local government in Solomon Islands

History of Solomon Islands 
 History of the Solomon Islands
 Timeline of the history of the Solomon Islands
 Current events of the Solomon Islands
 Military history of the Solomon Islands

Culture of Solomon Islands 
 Culture of the Solomon Islands
 Architecture of Solomon Islands
 Cuisine of the Solomon Islands
 Festivals in Solomon Islands
 Languages of the Solomon Islands
 Media in the Solomon Islands
 National symbols of Solomon Islands
 Coat of arms of the Solomon Islands
 Flag of the Solomon Islands
 National anthem of the Solomon Islands
 People of Solomon Islands
 Public holidays in the Solomon Islands
 Records of Solomon Islands
 Religion in the Solomon Islands
 Christianity in Solomon Islands
 Islam in the Solomon Islands
 Judaism in the Solomon Islands
 World Heritage Sites in Solomon Islands

Art in Solomon Islands 
 Art in Solomon Islands
 Cinema of Solomon Islands
 Literature of Solomon Islands
 Music of the Solomon Islands
 Television in Solomon Islands
 Theatre in Solomon Islands

Sports in Solomon Islands 
 Sport in the Solomon Islands
 Football in Solomon Islands

Economy and infrastructure of Solomon Islands 
 Economy of Solomon Islands
 Economic rank, by nominal GDP (2007): 181st (one hundred and eighty first)
 Agriculture in Solomon Islands
 Banking in Solomon Islands
 National Bank of Solomon Islands
 Communications in the Solomon Islands
 Internet in the Solomon Islands
 Companies of Solomon Islands
 Currency of the Solomon Islands: Dollar
 ISO 4217: SBD
 Energy in Solomon Islands
 Energy policy of Solomon Islands
 Oil industry in Solomon Islands
 Mining in Solomon Islands
 Tourism in Solomon Islands
 Transport in Solomon Islands
 Solomon Islands Stock Exchange

Education in Solomon Islands 
 Education in the Solomon Islands

Infrastructure of Solomon Islands
 Health care in Solomon Islands
 Transportation in the Solomon Islands
 Airports in Solomon Islands
 Rail transport in Solomon Islands
 Roads in Solomon Islands
 Water supply and sanitation in Solomon Islands

See also 

Index of Solomon Islands-related articles
List of international rankings
List of Solomon Islands-related topics
Member state of the Commonwealth of Nations
Member state of the United Nations
Outline of geography
Outline of Oceania
Solomon Islands

References

External links 

 1
 
Solomon Islands (archipelago)
Solomon Islands